Prince Alfons of Bavaria (24 January 1862 – 8 January 1933) was a member of the Bavarian Royal House of Wittelsbach and a General of Cavalry.

Early life
Alfons was born in Munich, Bavaria. He was the second son of Prince Adalbert of Bavaria and his wife Infanta Amalia of Spain.
In 1880, as so many young men of his age, Alfons joined the army, soon after becoming a young courtier protege to Ludwig II of Bavaria, and in 1892 became commander of the Bavarian Schweren-Reiter-Regiment. In 1905 he reached the rank General of Cavalry, finishing his career as the commander of 7 K.B. Chevaulegers-Regiment.

Marriage
On  15 April 1891 Prince Alfons married Princess Louise Victoire d'Orléans-Alençon, the daughter of Duke Ferdinand of Alençon and Duchess Sophie Charlotte in Bavaria. The wedding took place at the Nymphenburg Palace in Munich, Bavaria. The couple had two children:

 Prince Joseph Clemens of Bavaria (1902–1990)
 Princess Elisabeth Maria of Bavaria (1913–2005)

Death
Prince Alfons of Bavaria died on  8 January 1933 at Munich and is buried in the Colombarium in the Michaelskirche in Munich, Bavaria.

Decorations and awards
He received the following orders and decorations:

Ancestry

References

 Das Bayernbuch vom Kriege 1914-1918. Konrad Krafft von Dellmensingen, Friedrichfranz Feeser, Chr. Belser AG, Verlagsbuchhandlung, Stuttgart 1930
 Die Wittelsbacher. Geschichte unserer Familie. Prestel Verlag, München, 1979

Princes of Bavaria
House of Wittelsbach
1862 births
1933 deaths
People from the Kingdom of Bavaria
Members of the Bavarian Reichsrat
Bavarian generals
Burials at St. Michael's Church, Munich
Recipients of the Military Merit Order (Bavaria)
Recipients of the Iron Cross (1914), 2nd class
Grand Crosses of the Order of the Star of Romania
Knights of the Golden Fleece of Spain
Knights of Santiago